Sankt Johann am Wimberg is a municipality in the district of Rohrbach in the Austrian state of Upper Austria.

Geography
Sankt Johann am Wimberg lies in the eastern part of the district of Rohrbach in the upper Mühlviertel.

References

Cities and towns in Rohrbach District